The Unionist Movement of the Republic of Moldova (MURM or Romanian: Mișcarea Unionistă din Republica Moldova) is an organization and political party which has as its main goal the political union of Moldova and Romania.

History 
The organization has already started procedures to become a political party in the Republic of Moldova. Its president, Ilie Bratu, has stated that it would run in the parliamentary elections 2009.

On October 29, 2006, the MURM organized a protest against the then Communist leadership of Moldova, demanding that it should immediately start negotiations with Romania, aimed at uniting the two states. Further protests were held from December 3, 2006.

References

External links
Ilie Bratu a fost ales presedinte al Miscarii Unioniste din Republica Moldova 
A fost constituita Miscarea Unionista din Republica Moldova

2005 establishments in Moldova
Anti-Russian sentiment
Conservative parties in Moldova
Liberal conservative parties
Moldova–Romania relations
Political parties established in 2005
Political parties in Moldova
Pro-European political parties in Moldova
Romanian nationalism in Moldova